Twelve men's teams competed in basketball at the 1988 Summer Olympics.

Group A

Australia

The following is the Australia roster in the men's basketball tournament of the 1988 Summer Olympics.

Central African Republic

The following is the Central African Republic roster in the men's basketball tournament of the 1988 Summer Olympics.

Puerto Rico

The following is the Puerto Rico roster in the men's basketball tournament of the 1988 Summer Olympics.

South Korea

The following is the South Korea roster in the men's basketball tournament of the 1988 Summer Olympics.

Soviet Union

The following is the Soviet Union roster in the men's basketball tournament of the 1988 Summer Olympics.

Yugoslavia

The following is the Yugoslavia roster in the men's basketball tournament of the 1988 Summer Olympics.

Group B

Brazil

The following is the Brazil roster in the men's basketball tournament of the 1988 Summer Olympics.

Canada

The following is the Canada roster in the men's basketball tournament of the 1988 Summer Olympics.

China

The following is the China roster in the men's basketball tournament of the 1988 Summer Olympics.

Egypt

The following is the Egypt roster in the men's basketball tournament of the 1988 Summer Olympics.

Spain

The following is the Spain roster in the men's basketball tournament of the 1988 Summer Olympics.

United States

The following is the United States roster in the men's basketball tournament of the 1988 Summer Olympics.

References

1988